Gravity is the tenth studio album release by the Irish boy band Westlife and it was released on 22 November 2010 in the United Kingdom. John Shanks produced each song, barring the bonus track on the Japanese edition. The album was preceded by the lead single, "Safe", which was released at 14 November 2010. This is also the group's final album under Syco Music; Syco decided that there will be no second single from the album, which was one reason the group left Syco in March 2011. As of November 2011, the album had sold 358,943 in the UK. It was also the band's sixth album and studio album to be released as a four-piece.

Background, concept, and development

On 19 July 2010, it was reported by RTÉ that the group will be teaming up with Shanks. A Westlife insider said: "It's a major coup for Westlife to get this producer - he's produced all the big acts from Bon Jovi to the Backstreet Boys and Take That. "They wanted him for their last album but weren't able to get him. They're thrilled that he's agreed to work with them on this album." It also stated that the recording process started in July 2010. The band also confirmed the album's recording and mixing was finished in October 2010. They recorded the songs in Los Angeles, California, Dublin, Ireland, and London, England. On 17 September 2010, Egan flashed that the first single for the album was already picked by Cowell and a 30-second snippet was played on X Factor UK. Afterwards, Feehily initiated the #westlife11album and #westlifeSAFE as a trending topic on Twitter which was followed by others worldwide to be a top trending topic.

The album was released on 15 November 2010. In addition, Egan fully expressed what he felt on during recording Gravity: "It's hard to believe this is our 11th album but performing is our passion and it would seem like throwing it all away if we stopped.""Both us and Take That go for epic pop songs but them taking Robbie back hasn't made us think about Brian McFadden returning. It would feel odd to have a fifth person back on stage with us". In addition Westlife told Digital Spy: "We'd wanted to work with him for a long time, but all his loyalty was to Take That and he didn't want to work with another boyband," "We'd been asking him and asking, but literally within moments of Take That deciding to go and work with Stuart Price, he said yes to us straight away. Afterwards he said he'd wanted to work with us for a long time, but he just couldn't do the Take That thing and the Westlife thing because they were too close." "John created a sound for us in the same way he created a sound for Take That, a sound for Bon Jovi and a sound for all the other incredible artists he's worked with," "He created a sound for Westlife that we haven't had before - it's not a massive departure, but it's definitely a step up in terms of production." Filan also revealed that the group is currently in the process of selecting 12 or 13 songs for the album's final track listing from a pool of 16, with all but "one or two" likely to be originals. A track called "Beautiful" cwritten by Ryan Tedder, and Hunter Davis was supposed to be included according to SESAC music repertoire. On 22 October 2010, Shanks stated that they have finished the Westlife record, all approved by Cowell. Shanks stated that the album ended up with two covers in it. On 27 October 2010, the album main release date was changed to 22 November 2010. On 25 October 2010, Feehily unveiled the final track listing on his official Twitter page as follows: On 1 November 2010, Mark confirmed the two cover songs on the album are, "Chances" by Athlete and "The Reason" by Hoobastank. In the November 2010 issue of Hello Magazine they told them about their competition with Take That and Walsh and Cowell's involvement in the album, "You need competition to keep you on your toes".

On 2 November 2010, the 30-second snippet of each songs from the album were posted on Amazon.co.uk. On 5 November 2010, In Demand FM played exclusively the full track of "Beautiful Tonight" with an interview of the band. On 7 November 2010, they performed "I Will Reach You" on BBC Radio 2. On 14 November 2010, RTÉ 2fm exclusively played "I Will Reach You", "The Reason", and "I Get Weak" from the album for the first time worldwide.

In an interview with AOL Music UK, Westlife described the creative process of the album as "breath of fresh air". "It's a new beginning for Westlife" is how singer Shane Filan described working with legendary pop producer John Shanks.

Album name and artwork
The album cover was first displayed on the music record sites as "Westlife" with black background and white-colored lettering. On 22 October 2010, they released an exclusive video of the album photo shoot to the press and on their official sites. The official photographer of the shoot was Kevin McDaid and Feehily as the creative director. They decided to go for a chic black and white design and in the pics, the band are all dressed down in jeans and T-shirts. "Mark, Kian, Nicky and Shane stand separately in a line facing the camera on the Gravity front cover, with Shane leaning cheekily on Nicky's shoulder,"

On 13 October 2010, they announced the album title Gravity and trended worldwide on Twitter as #westlifegravity after the announcement. Band member Mark Feehily adopted the album title suggested by a fan and confirmed it on his Twitter account first. Redcorvette09 or Fiona Reynoldson, the chosen fan explains "Gravity" from the Safe lyrics. Maybe it's a dedication to your partners and how they've kept you grounded...or maybe about the music always drawing you back in for another album! Could have several meanings."Twitter / Fiona Reynoldson: @MarkusFeehily ...or maybe. Twitter.com. Retrieved on 28 November 2010. Egan said to the press people that the band will give something special to the chosen fan but it was yet undecided.

Promotion

Schedule

Singles
"Safe" was the lead single from the album, released on 14 November in the UK. Their debut performance of the track was on the X Factor the day or release. It peaked at No. 10 in its first week consequently making it their lowest charting lead single to date in the UK, as well as their lowest sales for a lead single.

"Beautiful Tonight" was confirmed as the follow-up single in January 2011. The song was performed live on Irish national television show Paul O'Grady Show. After that, the track peaked at the top 40 of Irish Radio Airplay Chart.

It was later confirmed on 1 February 2011 that there would be no second single for Gravity. Byrne stated that it was out of the band's hands and it was a Syco's decision. On 14 March 2011, Westlife confirmed that they had left Syco Music and moved to another Sony division, RCA, with the group citing the decision not to release a second single as the reason. Despite cancelled single, "I Will Reach You" was released as a follow-up promotional single on 17 February 2011 and as a radio single in April 2011 on some of the radio stations in Indonesia, Ireland and the Philippines where it charted and went to No. 1 on a radio station in the Philippines.

Track listing
All tracks produced by John Shanks except noted tracks.

Other credits
 Mark Feehily – art direction, creative direction
 Shari Sutcliffe – contract musician, production coordinator
 Steve Stacey – design
 Bob Ludwig – mastering
 Kevin McDaid – photography

Charts

Weekly charts

Year-end charts

Certifications and sales

Release history

Main release

Import release

References

Westlife albums
2010 albums
Albums produced by John Shanks
Syco Music albums
Sony Music albums
RCA Records albums